Saint-Étienne-de-Lauzon is a district (secteur) within Les Chutes-de-la-Chaudière-Ouest borough of the city of Lévis. Its population as of the Canada 2011 Census was 9,990.

It was incorporated in 1860 and remained a separate municipality until January 1, 2002, whereafter it became part of Lévis.

Neighbourhoods in Lévis, Quebec
Former municipalities in Quebec
Populated places disestablished in 2002